Peter Oehler (23 June 1883 – 15 April 1945) was a German wrestler. He competed in the light heavyweight event at the 1912 Summer Olympics.

References

External links
 

1883 births
1945 deaths
Olympic wrestlers of Germany
Wrestlers at the 1912 Summer Olympics
German male sport wrestlers
Sportspeople from Salzburg